The Plescioara (in its upper course also Șipotu) is a right tributary of the river Jaleș in Romania. Its source is in the Vâlcan Mountains. It flows into the Jaleș upstream from the Sohodol Gorge.

References

Rivers of Romania
Rivers of Gorj County